Tokia Russell (August 15, 1977 – June 22, 2016) was a Bermudian football player.

Club career
Russell began his career with the PHC Zebras, and played for the team for two years in the Bermudian Premier Division before joining the Bermuda Hogges in the USL Second Division in 2009. In August 2009, he switched Zebras for Dandy Town Hornets.

He joined Southampton Rangers from Dandy Town for the 2012–13 season.

International career
He made his debut for Bermuda in a January 2000 friendly match against Canada and earned a total of 8 caps, scoring 1 goal. He has represented his country in 4 FIFA World Cup qualification matches.

His final international match was a November 2004 CONCACAF Gold Cup qualification match against the British Virgin Islands.

International goals
Scores and results list Bermuda's goal tally first.

Personal life
Tokia's younger brother Antwan Russell also plays for Bermuda. His grandfather Earl is regarded as one of Bermuda's best ever players.

In 2011, Tokia was fined for drunk driving after crashing his car.

Tokia was killed by a driver on June 22, 2016 in a car accident.  Toe (as friends and family called him), was a motorist and died at the scene.

Tokia leaves behind him 2 children: a son Tokia Jnr and a daughter - Tazara.

References

External links

1977 births
2016 deaths
Association football defenders
Bermudian footballers
Bermuda international footballers
Dandy Town Hornets F.C. players
PHC Zebras players
Bermuda Hogges F.C. players
USL Second Division players
Road incident deaths in Bermuda